Pothavaram is a village in Nallajerla Mandal, West Godavari district  in Andhra Pradesh, India. Tadepalligudem is around 30 km from here. The nearest railway station is Badampudi(BPY) located at a distance of 21.01 Km.

Demographics 

 Census of India, Pothavaran had a population of 10130. The total population constitute, 5151 males and 4979 females with a sex ratio of 967 females per 1000 males. 1071 children are in the age group of 0–6 years, with sex ratio of 944 The average literacy rate stands at 73.66%.

References

Villages in West Godavari district